Master Sajjad Sings Memorable Classics is the debut album from Pakistani singer, songwriter, actor, director, musician, and composer Sajjad Ali. The album was released by EMI-Pakistan in 1979.

Musicians
The musicians were:

 Ghulam Ali (singer) 
 Mehdi Hassan
 Ghulam Ali
 Amanat Ali Khan

Lyricist
The album lyrics were written by the famous Urdu poets

 Hasrat Mohani
 Momin

Track listing
The album has 12 songs.

"Aaye Na Balam, آۓ نہ بالم"
"Yaad Piya Ki Aaye, یاد پیا کی آۓ"
"Nainan More Taras Rahe Hain, نینا مورے ترس رہے ہیں"
"Tori Tirchi Najarya Kay Baan, توری ترچھی نجریا کے بان"
"Maran Mithon Galri, مارن مٹھون گالڑی"
"Bajuband Khul Khul Jaye, باجو بند کھل جاۓ"
"Baghoon Main Paday Jhoolay, باغوں میں پڑے جھولے"
"Dekh To Dil, دیکھ تو دل"
"Jin Ke Hontoon Pay, جن کے ہونٹوں پے"
"Chaltay Ho To Chaman, چلتے ہو تو چمن"
"Chupkay Chupkay Raat Din, چپکے چپکے رات دن"
"Nawek Andaz Jidhar, ناوک انداذ"

External links
 Sajjad Ali fanclub on facebook
 Sajjad Ali fanclub on YouTube
 Sajjad Ali official facebook page
 Sajjad Ali official YouTube channel

1979 albums
Sajjad Ali albums